Iurie Roșca (born 31 October 1961) is a Moldovan politician who has served as president of the Christian-Democratic People's Party (PPCD) since 1994.

Biography 
Iurie Roșca graduated in 1984 from the journalism faculty of the State University of Moldova. He then worked as a correspondent for the newspaper Tinerimea Moldovei (The Youth of Moldova), a reporter for the National Television of Moldova, and an upper-level curator at the Dimitrie Cantemir Literature Museum in Chișinău.

Political career 
In 1989, Roșca became one of the founders of the Popular Front of Moldova (of which the PPCD is a successor). He was executive president of the organization from 1989 to 1994. Between 1990 and 2009, he was a deputy in the Parliament of the Republic of Moldova.

In 2005, his party voted for the reelection of the Communist president Vladimir Voronin, and he became the Parliament's vice-president (a post he also held from 1998 to 2001). In June 2009, he was sworn in as Deputy Prime Minister of the Moldovan Government  However, he only held that position until September of that year.

Notes

Romanian people of Moldovan descent
1961 births
Living people
Christian-Democratic People's Party (Moldova) politicians
Members of the parliament of Moldova
Deputy Prime Ministers of Moldova
Moldovan journalists
Male journalists
Deputy Presidents of the Moldovan Parliament
Moldova State University alumni
Moldovan MPs 1990–1994
Moldovan MPs 1994–1998
Moldovan MPs 1998–2001
Moldovan MPs 2001–2005
Moldovan MPs 2005–2009
Popular Front of Moldova MPs